Wycombe is a rural locality in the Maranoa Region, Queensland, Australia.

History 
The locality name derives from a pastoral run name, named by pastoralist John Beckett after his birthplace in High Wycombe, Buckinghamshire, England.

Whycombe Provisional School and Waroo Provisional School both opened in 1902 as a half-time provisional schools in conjunction (meaning the schools shared a single teacher). Whycombe Provisional School closed in 1907 and Warroo Provisional School became a full-time school, but then closed too circa 1910.

Wycombe State School opened on 26 February 1979 on Dilqui Road. It was mothballed on 31 December 2008 and closed on 31 December 2009. The school's website was archived.

Education 
There are no schools in Wycombe. The nearest government primary school is Begonia State School in neighbouring Begonia to the west. The nearest government secondary school is St George State High School in neighbouring St George to the south, but the distances involved are sufficiently large that distance education and boarding school are other alternatives.

References 

Maranoa Region
Localities in Queensland